Charles Andrew Parsons is a British television producer known as the creator of the Survivor franchise. He also created The Big Breakfast and The Word.

Education
Parsons was educated at Tonbridge School, a boarding independent school in Tonbridge in Kent in South East England, and credits the tough boarding school regime he endured there in the early 1970s, which at the time was commonplace, as providing an inspiration for his creation of the series Survivor. He then went to Pembroke College at the University of Oxford, where he studied English literature and afterwards trained as a journalist.

Life and career
The early days of Parsons's career saw him working at London Weekend Television on programmes including Network 7, which won a BAFTA award for originality. Parsons co-founded production company Planet 24 with Bob Geldof and his partner Waheed Alli.  Planet 24 created reality programs including The Big Breakfast, The Word, and Survivor, which first aired in Sweden during the 1997 season. Planet 24 was sold to Carlton in 1999, but the owners kept the rights to Survivor. Charlie Parsons is currently the Executive Producer of US version of Survivor in its 43rd season on CBS.

Parsons has also developed and produced shows for the stage. Parsons is developing Runaway Entertainment with Olivier-award-winning producer Tristan Baker. Girl from the North Country returns from its Broadway acclaim to The Gielgud Theatre in London and is one of the many shows developed and produced by Runaway Entertainment.

Parsons founded The Great BBC Campaign, set up to provide a bold ambitious new mandate for the BBC, designed to build on the success of the impartial and independent broadcasting organisation.

References

External links

Alumni of Pembroke College, Oxford
British television producers
Living people
1958 births
People educated at Tonbridge School
British LGBT businesspeople
21st-century LGBT people